István Plattkó also known as Esteban Platko (4 May 1883 – 16 November 1966) was a Hungarian football player and manager who coached Real Valladolid, Granada CF, CD Atlético Baleares and RCD Mallorca in Spain. His brothers were Franz Platko and Carlos Platko.

Plattkó spent much of his coaching career in the Balearic Islands with CD Constancia, CD Binissalem and CD Atlético Baleares before he died in Palma, Majorca, Spain.

References

External links
 

1883 births
1966 deaths
Hungarian footballers
Hungarian football managers
Hungarian expatriate football managers
La Liga managers
Real Valladolid managers
CD Atlético Baleares managers
RCD Mallorca managers
Granada CF managers
Arenas Club de Getxo managers
Hungarian expatriate sportspeople in Spain
Expatriate football managers in Spain
Association footballers not categorized by position
CE Constància managers
CD Binissalem managers
Footballers from Budapest